Jean Frédéric André Poupart de Neuflize, 4th Baron of Neuflize CVO (21 August 1850 – 20 September 1928) was a French banker and equestrian. He won the bronze medal in the mail coach event at the 1900 Summer Olympics. He was appointed an officer of the Legion of Honour.

Early life
 
Neuflize was born in Paris on 21 August 1850 into the prominent minority Protestant establishment of France. He was the eldest son of Jean André Poupart de Neuflize, 3rd Baron of Neuflize (1820–1868), and his wife, Marie Louise André (1826–1907).

His great-grandfather, Jean Abraham Poupart de Neuflize (who was made the first Baron of Neuflize in 1810), built the Château de Montvillers in 1770 in Bazeilles in the Grand Est region of northern France.

He was educated at the Lycée Saint-Louis, followed by the Lycée Bonaparte.

Career
Neuflize, a banker, succeeded his father as the head of the Banque de Neuflize et Cie in Paris, which had been founded in 1710 by his great-grandfather Jean Abraham Poupart de Neuflize, a draper from Sedan, Ardennes, and traced its lineage to seventeenth century Genoa.. His family's bank was among the most prominent banking houses of France, which included the Hottinguer, Mallet, Rothschilds and Vernes banks. He was succeeded in the bank by his second son, Jacques, who was the representative of the Banque de French in America during World War I.

From 1902 until his death in 1928, he was a Regent of Banque de France, the central bank of France, and was serving as Dean of Regents at the time of his death. In 1904, he helped established the French investment bank Banque de l'Union Parisienne. He was also vice president of Paris, Lyons & Marseilles Railway, chairman of the board of directors of the Ottoman Bank, and president of the Évian Mineral Water Society.

Equestrian
Neuflize competed in the mail coach event at the 1900 Summer Olympics, winning the bronze medal.

Personal life
On 28 April 1874, Neuflize was married to Madeleine Dolfuss-Davilliers (1855–1926). She was born in Soisy-sous-Montmorency and was a daughter of Mathieu Dollfus and Laure Cécile Davillier, and granddaughter of industrialist Jean Dollfus. In Paris, they lived at 7 Rue Alfred-de-Vigny, a Hôtel particulier in the 8th arrondissement, Together, they were the parents of three children:

 André Poupart de Neuflize (1875–1949), who in 1903 married American heiress Eva Barbey (1879–1969), a daughter of Henry Isaac Barbey and Mary Lorillard Barbey and sister of Hélène Barbey (who married Count Hermann de Pourtalès).
 Jacques Poupart de Neuflize (1883–1953), a banker who married Alixe Coche de la Ferté (1893–1923), a daughter of Alexandre Coche de la Ferté. After her death, he married Antoinette Meyer-Borel (d. 1942).
 Roberte Poupart de Neuflize (1892–1979), who married Vere Ponsonby, 9th Earl of Bessborough, the son of Edward Ponsonby, 8th Earl of Bessborough, in 1912.

In 1897, he built the Château des Tilles, a large Norman villa near Coye-la-Forêt in the Oise department in northern France near Chantilly.

Neuflize was appointed a chevalier of the Legion of Honour in 1900, and an officer in 1908.

The Baron de Neuflize died on 20 September 1928 at Coye-la-Forêt. His funeral was held at the Père Lachaise Cemetery where he was buried.

Descendants
Through his eldest son, André, he was a grandfather of Jacqueline de Neuflize, who married Baron Jean de Watteville-Berckheim of Paris in 1937, Marie Madeleine de Neuflize, who married the Baron Christian de Turckheim (and resided at Château de Blanant in Lorraine), and Genevieve de Neuflize (1907–1938), who married Count Costa de Beauregard (later the Marquis de Beauregard), the son of Ferdinand Costa, Marquis de Beauregard.

Through his daughter, the Countess of Bessborough, he was a grandfather of four, including: Frederick Edward Neuflize Ponsonby, 10th Earl of Bessborough (1913–1993), the Hon. Desmond Neuflize Ponsonby (1915–1925), who died young, Lady Moyra Ponsonby (1918–2016), and Lt. Hon. George St Lawrence Neuflize Ponsonby (1931–1951).

References
Notes

Sources

External links

A Very Noble Pair: Vere Ponsonby, 9th Earl of Bessborough & Roberte Poupart de Neuflize at The Esoteric Curiosa.

1850 births
1928 deaths
Burials at Père Lachaise Cemetery
Equestrians at the 1900 Summer Olympics
French bankers
French male equestrians
Medalists at the 1900 Summer Olympics
Olympic equestrians of France
Olympic bronze medalists for France
Olympic medalists in equestrian
Sportspeople from Paris
Officiers of the Légion d'honneur